Radošina is a municipality in the Topoľčany District of the Nitra Region, Slovakia. In 2011 it had 2013 inhabitants.

It is located in the southwestern part of Topoľčany district, on the border mountains Interesting Routes Nitra and downs. The village lies at 216 m above sea level, the cadastral territory covers an area of 2767 ha and has over two thousand inhabitants.

The area of Radošina was inhabited during the Middle Paleolithic, as evidenced by the findings in the cave called Devil's Furnace.

Radošina was created to communicate a very exposed location in the district is already in the early Middle Ages cruised important long-distance routes.

The village's name probably comes from the river, which was first mentioned in a deed of Nitra Alphonsus Vincent from 1249 as Radusna. Over the 13th century, Radošina grew into a quite populous village. In the third 14th century it belonged to the Bishopric of Nitra. In the mid-16th century, Radošina is mentioned as a town - oppidum.

In the administrative area Radošina are many important cultural landmarks. Radošina is known as a wine region; the origins of viticulture here date back to the 15th century. In the 19th century, a breeding and seed station began. The excellent results achieved in breeding barley and vines, known as Radošinský Klevner was first planted in 1921. This wine was even served at the wedding of Queen Elizabeth and the English still belongs to one of the most popular brands of wines.

In this region there is a major water source that supplies drinking water to surrounding areas.

References

External links
Radosina
Official homepage 

Villages and municipalities in Topoľčany District